John Walter Jones (April 14, 1878 – March 31, 1954) was a politician and farmer in Prince Edward Island, Canada. An agronomist, he was instrumental in introducing the potato crop to the island, which was to become a staple of the economy. In 1935, he received the King George V medal as the best farmer in the province.

Born in Pownal, he first ran for public office in the 1921 federal election as a Farmer-Progressive candidate, but failed to win a seat in the House of Commons of Canada.

He was first elected to the Legislative Assembly of Prince Edward Island as a Liberal in 1935. In 1943, he became the 20th premier of the province when Thane A. Campbell was appointed Chief Justice of the PEI Supreme Court.

The government of "Farmer Jones" repealed strict prohibition, and created the PEI Liquor Control Commission to regulate the sale of liquor. He had to proceed by order-in-council because the lieutenant governor, as a prohibitionist, refused to give Royal Assent to the necessary legislation. In 1947, his government broke a strike at Canada Packers, a meat-packing plant, by seizing the plant, employing strike-breakers and outlawing trade union affiliation with national or international unions in the name of "protect(ing) the farm interest".

He left provincial politics in 1953 to accept an appointment to the Senate of Canada.

External links 
 
 

1878 births
1954 deaths
Canadian Baptists
Canadian senators from Prince Edward Island
Liberal Party of Canada senators
Premiers of Prince Edward Island
People from Queens County, Prince Edward Island
Prince Edward Island Liberal Party MLAs
Prince Edward Island Liberal Party leaders
Progressive Party of Canada candidates in the 1921 Canadian federal election